Mirjana Ognjenović (born 17 September 1953, in Zagreb) is a former Yugoslav/Croatian handball player who competed in the 1980 Summer Olympics and in the 1984 Summer Olympics.

In 1980 she won the silver medal with the Yugoslav team. She played all five matches and scored eleven goals.

Four years later she won the gold medal as member of the Yugoslav team. She played four matches including the final and scored ten goals.

External links
profile

1953 births
Living people
Yugoslav female handball players
Croatian female handball players
Handball players at the 1980 Summer Olympics
Handball players at the 1984 Summer Olympics
Olympic handball players of Yugoslavia
Olympic gold medalists for Yugoslavia
Olympic silver medalists for Yugoslavia
Olympic medalists in handball
Medalists at the 1984 Summer Olympics
Medalists at the 1980 Summer Olympics